C. calamus may refer to:

Calamus calamus, the saucereye porgy, a fish species
Cirrhimuraena calamus, an eel species

See also
Calamus (disambiguation)